The Mission district is an inner city neighbourhood of Calgary, Alberta, Canada, that originated as , a Catholic mission, and was for a time the incorporated Village of Rouleauville. Mission is bordered by 4th Street SW with restaurants and shops, and it hosts the Lilac Festival in June.

It is represented in the Calgary City Council by the Ward 8 councillor. The community has an area redevelopment plan in place.

History 

In 1883, Oblate missionary Father Albert Lacombe, returning after a ten-year absence, obtained two quarter sections of land for a "Mission district" to ensure a strong French-speaking Catholic community. Father Scollen, who had lived in the area since 1862 and who had witnessed Treaty Six with the Cree nations and Treaty Seven with the Blackfoot Confederacy, left for Edmonton and then the United States.

After obtaining the rest of the land that is now Mission, the area was incorporated on November 2, 1899, as the Village of Rouleauville, named after Charles Rouleau. The village was founded in what was then the District of Alberta in the North-West Territories.  Despite Lacombe's desire to preserve the French language and culture, Rouleauville progressively lost its French character, becoming overwhelmingly English. In 1907 the village was annexed by Calgary. In the process all the French names of streets were replaced by Calgary's street numbering system.

Mission is one of many Calgary neighbourhoods impacted by flood events. In 1929, the area was submerged when the Bow River overran its banks. The area was again impacted by floods in June 2013. An evacuation was ordered on June 20 for a minimum of 72 hours.

Institutions 
In the latter part of his life, Lacombe helped found a number of Catholic schools throughout the West, including St. Mary's School in 1885, initially using a two-storey log cabin convent in Mission district (Rouleauville). It is now the oldest school still operating in Calgary (though in a newer building).

In 1889 St. Mary's Church was founded, and in 1912 it became St. Mary's Cathedral when it became the seat of the newly formed Diocese of Calgary.

Demographics 

Residents in this community had a median household income of $37,040 in 2000, and there were 25% low income residents living in the neighbourhood. As of 2000, 20.1% of the residents were immigrants.

See also 
List of former urban municipalities in Alberta
St. Mary's Parish Hall

References

External links 
Local Mission Cliff Bungalow Community Association

Neighbourhoods in Calgary
1875 establishments in the British Empire
1907 disestablishments in Alberta
Former villages in Alberta
Franco-Albertan culture
Christian missions in North America
Catholic missions